CXO may refer to:

Chandra X-ray Observatory, a satellite launched by NASA in 1999
Chief experience officer, corporate officer responsible for the overall user experience of an organization
CxO (Chief-"x"-officer), also called C-suite, a generic term for any corporate officer
CrossOver (software), a commercial version of WINE which runs Windows applications on Linux, Mac OS X and Solaris
Lone Star Executive Airport, the airport in Conroe, Texas, United States (IATA code)